Şahin Menge (born 2 July 1965) is a Turkish weightlifter. He competed in the men's middleweight event at the 1988 Summer Olympics.

References

1965 births
Living people
Turkish male weightlifters
Olympic weightlifters of Turkey
Weightlifters at the 1988 Summer Olympics
Place of birth missing (living people)
20th-century Turkish people